Same-sex adoption is the adoption of children by same-sex couples. It may take the form of a joint adoption by the couple, or of the adoption by one partner of the other's biological child (stepchild adoption). 

Joint adoption by same-sex couples is permitted in 34 countries, most of the countries and territories that allow same-sex marriage, as well as in several countries and dependent territories that do not: namely Croatia, Israel, Liechtenstein, Bermuda and the Cayman Islands. (In some of the countries with marriage, legislation for adoption preceded that for marriage.) However, only stepchild adoption is permitted in Taiwan (though since 2022 there is court precedent for joint adoption), and not even that is allowed in Ecuador, which has a constitutional ban. Adoption is only permitted for same sex married couples in 21 of the 31 Mexican states and Mexico City, despite a Supreme Court ruling that requires states to allow it. Stepchild adoption is permitted for same-sex couples in a couple additional countries without same-sex marriage, namely Estonia and San Marino.

Given that constitutions and statutes usually do not address the adoption rights of LGBT persons, judicial decisions often determine whether they can serve as parents either individually or as couples. Opponents of adoption by same-sex couples have argued that LGBT parenting adversely affects children. However, research consistently shows that gay and lesbian parents are as fit and capable as heterosexual parents, and their children are as psychologically healthy and well-adjusted as those reared by heterosexual parents.

Same-sex parents pursuing adoption must also contend with social pressures to conform to heteronormative gender roles. The concept of gender role models is necessitated by the bureaucratic organization of foster care and adoption agencies, particularly in the United States.

LGBT parenting

The existing body of research on outcomes for children with LGBT parents includes limited studies that consider the specific case of adoption. Moreover, where studies do mention adoption they often fail to distinguish between outcomes for unrelated children versus those in their original family or step-families, causing research on the more general case of LGBT parenting to be used to counter the claims of LGBT-adoption opponents. One study has addressed the question directly, evaluating the outcomes of adoptees less than 3-years old who had been placed in one of 56 lesbian and gay households since infancy. Despite the small sample, and the fact that the children have yet to become aware of their adoption status or the dynamics of gender development, the study found no significant associations between parental sexual orientation and child adjustment.

Scientific research indicates that the children of same-sex couples fare just as well as the children of opposite-sex couples.

In 1979, Reverend John Kuiper of the Metropolitan Community Church and his husband became the first gay men in America to win the right to adopt a child.

Debate

Arguments
The adoption of children by LGBT people is an issue of active debate. In the United States, for example, legislation to prevent adoption by LGBT people has been introduced in many jurisdictions; such efforts have largely been defeated. Prior to 1973, state courts commonly barred gay and lesbian individuals from holding a parenting role, especially through adoption.

Major professional organizations have made statements in defense of adoption by same-sex couples. The American Psychological Association has supported adoption by same-sex couples, citing social prejudice as harming the psychological health of lesbians and gays while noting there is no evidence that their parenting causes harm. The American Medical Association has issued a similar position supporting second parent adoption by same-sex partner, stating that lack of formal recognition can cause health-care disparities for children of same-sex parents.

The following arguments are made in support of adoption by LGBT parents:
The right of a child to have a family, guardians or people who can take care of their wellbeing.
Human rights – child's and parent's right to have a family life.
There are almost no differences between children raised by same-sex or straight couples. For that reason, sexual orientation of the parents has almost no relevance when it comes to raising a child
Evidence confirming that, despite the claims of those opposed to LGBT+ parenting, same-sex couples can provide good conditions to raise a child
For the children, adoption is a better alternative to orphanage
Less formalities for step-parents in everyday life, as well as the situation of a death of a biological parent of a child

Public opinion

Legal status

Joint adoption by same-sex couples is legal in the following 34 countries:
 Andorra (2014)
 Argentina (2010)
 Australia (first jurisdiction 2002, last jurisdiction 2018)
 Austria (2016)
 Belgium (2006)
 Brazil (2010)
 Canada (first jurisdiction 1996, last jurisdiction 2011)
 Chile (2022)
 Colombia (2015)
Costa Rica (2020)
 Croatia (2022)
 Cuba (2022)
 Denmark (2010)
 Greenland (2016)
 Faroe Islands (2017)
 Finland (2017)
 France (2013)
 Germany (2017)
 Iceland (2006)
 Ireland (2015)
 Israel (2008)
 Liechtenstein (2022)
 Luxembourg (2015)
 Malta (2014)
 Netherlands (2001)
 New Zealand (2013)
 Norway (2009)
 Portugal (2016)
 Slovenia (2022)
 South Africa (2002)
 Spain (2005)
 Sweden (2003)
 Switzerland (2022)
 United Kingdom
 England and Wales (2005)
 Scotland (2009)
 Northern Ireland (2013)
 United States (first jurisdiction 1993, last jurisdiction 2017)
 Uruguay (2009)

Joint adoption by same-sex couples is legal in the following subnational jurisdictions or dependent territories:
 UK Crown Dependencies and British Overseas Territories:
 Bermuda (2015)
 Cayman Islands (2019)
 Gibraltar (2014)
 Guernsey (2017)
 Isle of Man (2011)
 Jersey (2012)
 Pitcairn Islands (2015)
 Falkland Islands (2017)
 Saint Helena, Ascension and Tristan da Cunha (2017)
 Mexico:
 Aguascalientes (2019)
 Baja California (2017)
 Baja California Sur (2022)
 Campeche (2016)
 Chiapas (2017)
 Chihuahua (2017)
 Coahuila (2014)
 Colima (2016)
 Durango (2022 -- prohibition never existed)
 Jalisco (2019)
 Hidalgo (2019)
 Mexico City (2010)
 Michoacán (2016)
 Morelos (2016)
 Nayarit (2019)
 Nuevo Leon (2019)
 Puebla (2017)
 Querétaro (2017)
 Quintana Roo (2022)
 San Luis Potosí (2019)
 Tamaulipas (prior to 2022 -- there is no prohibition)
 Veracruz (2016)
 Caribbean Netherlands (2012)

The following countries permit step-child adoption in which the partner in a relationship can adopt the natural and the adopted child of his or her partner:

 Estonia (2016)
 San Marino (2018)
 Taiwan (2019)
In Italy step-child adoption is not legal and can only be recognized by court order under very limited circumstances.

Africa

South Africa
South Africa is the only African country to allow joint adoption by same-sex couples. The 2002 decision of the Constitutional Court in the case of Du Toit v Minister of Welfare and Population Development amended the Child Care Act, 1983 to allow both joint adoption and stepparent adoption by "permanent same-sex life partners". The Child Care Act has since been replaced by the Children's Act, 2005, which allows joint adoption by "partners in a permanent domestic life-partnership", whether same- or opposite-sex, and stepparent adoption by a person who is the "permanent domestic life-partner" of the child's current parent. Same-sex marriage has been legal since 2006, and is equivalent to opposite-sex marriage for all purposes, including adoption.

Americas

Argentina 
Argentina allows adoption by same and different-sex marriages, and even by single people, since 2010. The law makes no difference in the requeriments for adoption for any of these.

Canada 
Canada has no nation-wide law legalizing same-sex adoption, but rather has smaller provincial laws that cover the entire nation. Same-sex adoption legalization in Canada began with British Columbia in 1996 and was finalized with Nunavut in 2011. By 2013, an Ipsos Global poll showed 70% of Canadians approved of same-sex adoption to some degree with 45% strongly approving.

Chile
Since March 10, 2022,  joint parenthood of same-sex couples is legal after the entry into force of Law 21,400 on Equal Marriage, which explicitly guarantees non-discrimination based on sexual orientation and gender identity for custody purposes, filiation and adoption whether or not the couples are married or whether or not they had their children through assisted human fertilization. The law amends the Civil Code to recognise as parents of children as their mother and/or father, their two mothers, or their two fathers.

A 2021 survey, shows that 65% of Chileans support same-sex adoption.

Colombia
On 4 November 2015, in a 6-2 Constitutional Court ruling, Colombia decided to allow adoption by LGBT peoples. The ruling came before same-sex marriage became legal in the country on 28 April 2016.

Cuba 
Cuba allows adoption by same-sex marriages (since September 2022 referendum) and different-sex marriages, and even by single people.

Honduras 
As of May 2019, the Honduras Supreme Court is expected to rule on a decision regarding both same-sex marriage and adoption.

Mexico
Same-sex couples are able to adopt in Mexico City (since 2010), Coahuila (2014), Campeche (2016), Colima (2016), Michoacán (2016), Morelos (2016), Veracruz (2016), Baja California (2017), Chihuahua (2017), Querétaro (2017), Puebla (2018), Chiapas (2018), Nayarit (2019), Aguascalientes (2019), Hidalgo (2019), San Luis Potosí (2019), Quintana Roo (2022) and Durango (2022).

In Mexico City, the Legislative Assembly of the Federal District passed legislation on 21 December 2009 enabling same-sex couples to adopt children. Eight days later, Head of Government ("Mayor") Marcelo Ebrard signed the bill into law, which officially took effect on 4 March 2010.

On 24 November 2011, the Coahuila Supreme Court struck down the state's law barring same-sex couples from adopting, urging the state's legislature to amend the adoption law as soon as possible. On 12 February 2014, the state's congress overwhelmingly approved the measure more than two years following the supreme court decision.

On 3 February 2017 the SCJN emitted tesis 08/2017 in which it is stated that the family of the LGBT community doesn't end with a couple, but that it also extends onto the right to have and raise children. Therefore, LGBT couples wishing to form a family and adopt children will be legally protected and can't be limited by any governmental entity.

In October 2021, a bill was introduced to the legislature of Baja California Sur.

In September 2022, a bill was passed in Quintana Roo.

United States

Adoption by LGBT individuals or same-sex couples is legal in all fifty states as of June 2017.

Uruguay
A government-sponsored adoption law in Uruguay allowing LGBT adoption was approved by the lower house on 28 August 2009, and by the Senate on 9 September 2009. In October 2009, the law was signed by President and took effect. According to Equipos Mori Poll's, 53% of Uruguayans are opposed to same sex adoption against 39% that support it. Interconsult's Poll made in 2008 says that 49% are opposed to same sex adoption against 35% that support it.

Asia
LGBT rights for adoption of children in Asia are almost inexistent, except in Israel. Some Asian countries still criminalise same-sex activities, do not have anti-discrimination laws, which are an obstacle from legislating for LGBT adoption.

Israel
A January 2005 ruling of the Israeli Supreme Court allowed stepchild adoptions for same-sex couples. Israel previously allowed limited co-guardianship rights for non-biological parents. In February 2008, a court in Israel ruled that same-sex couples were now permitted to adopt a child regardless of whether the child is biologically related or not to either parent. This marked a watershed in granting equal rights to all gay people in Israel.

Taiwan
Members of same-sex couples can only adopt the biological child of their spouse (so-called stepchild adoptions). Taiwan law allows for opposite-sex married people to jointly adopt, and also allows single individuals to adopt, depending on the circumstances, including individual LGBT people. The same-sex marriage law only grants same-sex couples the right to adopt children genetically related to one of the spouses.

Europe

In February 2006, France's Court of Cassation ruled that both partners in a same-sex relationship can have parental rights over one partner's biological child. The result came from a case where a woman tried to give parental rights of her two daughters to her partner, with whom she was in a civil union. In the case of adoption, however, in February 2007, the same court ruled against a lesbian couple where one partner tried to adopt the child of the other partner. The court stated that the woman's partner cannot be recognized unless the mother withdrew her own parental rights. On 17 May 2013, French President François Hollande signed into law the bill that opened marriage and adoption rights linked to it for same sex couples.

In 1998, a nursery school teacher from Lons-le-Saunier, living as a couple with another woman, had applied for an authorization to adopt a child from the département (local government) of Jura. The adoption board recommended against the authorization because the child would lack a paternal reference, and thus the president of the département ruled against the authorization. The case was appealed before the administrative courts and ended before the Council of State, acting as supreme administrative court, which ruled against the woman. The European Court of Human Rights concluded that these actions and this ruling were a violation of Article 14 of the European Convention on Human Rights taken in conjunction with Article 8.

On 2 June 2006, the Icelandic Parliament unanimously passed a proposal accepting adoption, parenting and assisted insemination treatment for same-sex couples on the same basis as heterosexual couples. The law went into effect on 27 June 2006.

In Bulgaria, according to the Ministry of Justice the laws regarding adoption "lack a norm, concerning the sexual orientation of the individuals". Therefore, a single gay person or same-sex couples may adopt.

On 17 May 2013, the Portuguese parliament approved a bill in first reading allowing "co-adoption" of the biological or adopted child of the same-sex spouse or partner, where that spouse or partner is the only legally recognized parent of the child (e.g. the mother with the natural father not being registered). However, in October 2013 members of parliament opposed to the bill proposed a referendum on the issue and killed a motion to have the second vote in the plenary; the motion on the possible referendum was then considered, but the Constitutional Court declared it unconstitutional. On 14 March 2014, the original bill was rejected in second reading. On 20 November 2015, 5 proposals from several left-wing parties were voted favourably by the new parliament as result of 4 October General Elections.

In July 2014 through Life Partnership Act Croatia recognized an institution similar to step-child adoption called partner-guardian. A partner who is not a biological parent of a child can share parental responsibilities with a biological parent or parents if they agree to it, or if the court decides it is in the best interest of a child. Additionally, a biological parent or parents can temporarily give a partner who is not a biological parent full parental responsibilities. A partner who is not a biological parent can also gain permanent parental responsibilities through an institution of partner-guardian if both biological parents of a child have died, or exceptionally if a second biological parent of a child is unknown, and if the court decides it is in the best interest of a child.

In January 2015, the Constitutional Court of Austria found the existing laws on adoption to be unconstitutional and ordered the laws to be changed by 31 December 2015 to allow joint adoption by same-sex couples in Austria.

On 6 April 2015, the Children and Family Relationships Bill 2015 passed by Parliament in March 2015 which extends full adoption rights to cohabiting couples and those in civil partnerships was promulgated by the President of Ireland. The law went into effect a year later on 6 April 2016.

On 20 November 2015 the Portuguese Parliament approved; by 141 votes against 87 with 2 abstentions; a diploma presented by all the parties (except the right-wing PàF) to allow same-sex adoption. On 26 January 2016, the conservative Portuguese President Aníbal Cavaco Silva vetoed the bill and a week later the Portuguese Parliament overridden the veto. The law went into effect on 1 March 2016.

On 22 June 2016 the Italian Supreme Court of Cassation upheld a lower court's decision to approve a request for a lesbian to adopt her partner's daughter. Prosecutors had appealed against the decision by the Rome court of appeal. Decisions by the supreme court set a precedent.

In December 2020, Hungary explicitly legally banned adoption for same-sex couples within its constitution.

In April 2021, a court in Croatia ruled that same-sex partners have the right to adopt children. In May 2022, the High Administrative Court affirmed the ruling and rejected the appeal of the responsible Ministry.

In June 2022, the Constitutional Court of Slovenia ruled that same-sex partners have the right to jointly adopt. On 4 October 2022, the National Assembly (lower chamber of Slovenian parliament) passed the relevant act implementing this judgement, but a week later, the act was vetoed by the National Council (upper chamber of the parliament). This is to be followed by another vote on the act in the National Assembly and potentially a national referendum.

Oceania

Australia
In Australia, same-sex adoption is legal in all states and territories since April 2018.

New Zealand

The Marriage (Definition of Marriage) Amendment Act 2013, which came into force on 19 August 2013, allowed same-sex marriage and permitted married same-sex couples to jointly adopt children. Previously, an LGBT individual was able to adopt children, but same-sex couples could not adopt jointly.

Currently, there are no specific barriers preventing an LGBT individual from adopting children, except that a male individual cannot adopt a female child. Same-sex marriage law became effective from 19 August 2013, and since then married same-sex couples were able to adopt children jointly. Unmarried couples of any sex and couples in a civil union can now jointly adopt children, under a New Zealand High Court ruling in December 2015. The ban breached the New Zealand Bill of Rights Act 1990. The minimum age to adopt in New Zealand is 20 years for a related child, and 25 years or the child's age plus 20 years (whichever is greater) for an unrelated child.

Summary of laws by jurisdiction

See also
 Same-sex marriage
 Civil union
 LGBT rights
 Heterosexism
 Adoption proceedings of Emma Rose
 Mommy Mommy, a 2007 documentary about a lesbian adoptive couple
 Preacher's Sons, a 2008 documentary about a gay adoptive couple
 Catholic Charities USA § Controversies
 Same-sex adult adoption

References

Further reading
 Primary resource collection and readings. Library of Congress. Jefferson or Adams Bldg General or Area Studies Reading Rms
 Primary resource collection and readings. Library of Congress. Jefferson or Adams Bldg General or Area Studies Reading Rms
Stacey, J. & Davenport, E. (2002) Queer Families Quack Back, in: D. Richardson & S. Seidman (Eds) Handbook of Lesbian and Gay Studies. (London, SAGE Publications), 355–374.
New Zealand Law Commission: Adoption- Options for Reform: Wellington: New Zealand Law Commission Preliminary Paper No 38: 1999:

External links
Gay.com – Adoption and Parenting – News and Current Events pertaining to the rights and responsibilities of same-sex parents in adopting and parenting
Canada.com "In the Family Way" – News story of gay and lesbian adoptive families, and the surrogate and donor family

 
Adoption forms and related practices
Adoption, fostering, orphan care and displacement
Family law
Adoption